MacFormat is the UK's biggest computer magazine aimed at Macintosh users. It published 13 issues per year. It is published by Future plc, and has been since 1993.

Content
The main content of this magazine includes news from major Apple events such as the WWDC or the Macworld Expo, features, detailed tutorials and reviews of the latest accessories and apps. Until 2012, the magazine included a free cover disc filled with Mac software mentioned in the magazine. In previous years, MacFormat came with programs on a free 3½-inch (88.9 mm) Floppy disk, CD or CD/DVD option as reflected the state of cheap removable media in that era.

Editorial team
 Editor: Rob Mead-Green
 Managing Art Editor: Paul Blachford
 Operations Editor: Jo Membery

References

External links
 

1993 establishments in the United Kingdom
Computer magazines published in the United Kingdom
Macintosh magazines
Magazines established in 1993
Mass media in Bath, Somerset
Monthly magazines published in the United Kingdom